Adam Nicol (born 2 July 1997 in Aberdeen, Scotland) is a Scotland U20 international rugby union player who plays for Jersey Reds at the Tighthead Prop position. He previously played for Glasgow Warriors and Stirling County.

Rugby Union career

Amateur career

Nicol grew up in Bermuda and started at the Bermuda Youth Rugby Program, representing Bermuda as a school boy V Cayman in 2008.  On return to Scotland he started out with Dunfermline, Nicol moved on to play for Glasgow University, Glasgow Hawks and then Stirling County. He studies Earth Sciences at Glasgow University.

Nicol has been drafted to Stirling County in the Scottish Premiership for the 2018-19 season.

Professional career

On 25 November 2016, Nicol played for Glasgow Warriors against Ospreys in the Pro12, replacing D'Arcy Rae at Tighthead Prop. He became Glasgow Warrior No. 275.

He was enrolled in the Scottish Rugby Academy for their 2017-18 intake as a Stage 3 player. Stage 3 players are assigned a professional club; Nicol was assigned to Glasgow Warriors.

He played again for Glasgow Warriors in their opening match of the 2017-18 season - against Northampton Saints at Bridgehaugh Park, Stirling on 19 August 2017. He made 18 competitive appearances for the club.

On 9 April 2021 it was announced that he had joined Jersey Reds with immediate effect. The deal is initially a loan to the end of the season, but the move will be made permanent thereafter.

International career

Nicol was picked for Scotland at U16 level.

He then moved up in his international career with Scotland at Under 18 level, playing against England in Match 2015.

He received his first Scotland U20 cap against England in the Under 20 Six Nations of 2016.

Whilst with the U20 side Nicol displayed a level of destructive scrummaging rare in age grade rugby and confirmed his status as one of the biggest prospects in Scottish rugby.

References

External links 
 Scottish Rugby profile
 Scrum magazine Glasgow University RFC Profile

1997 births
Living people
Scottish rugby union players
Rugby union props
Glasgow Warriors players
Dunfermline RFC players
Stirling County RFC players
Glasgow University RFC players
Rugby union players from Aberdeen
Jersey Reds players
Glasgow Hawks players
People educated at Queen Anne High School, Dunfermline